Jimmy Chisholm (born 16 September 1956 in Inverness) is a Scottish actor in film, theatre and television. He trained as an actor at Queen Margaret University, Edinburgh. He currently plays the part of Sonny Caplan in the BBC Scotland production, River City. He played Jimmy Blair from 1980 to 1986 in Scottish Television's long-running soap opera Take the High Road. In film, his credits include Braveheart (1995), as Faudron, and Mrs Brown (1997), as Mr Grant. On the stage, Chisholm is mostly associated with the Royal Lyceum Theatre which he calls his "acting home".

Filmography

Film

Television

Theatre

References

Bibliography

External links
 

1956 births
Living people
People from Inverness
Scottish male soap opera actors
Scottish male television actors
Take the High Road